Guy Richards (born 21 March 1983) is an Australian rules footballer in the Australian Football League.

From Coldstream, Richards was drafted in the 2000 National Draft to Collingwood, but took until 2004 to make his AFL debut. Continually developed into a good tap ruckman, Richards was forced to miss his early seasons as a football through injuries, mainly knee injuries hampered his start. When making his debut, he took time to become a dominant player but showed what he could, giving him 12 games since debut, before once again outed with a groin injury. It did not stop him from winning the best first year player however, 2005 was like the early years, a knee and then hip injury, nothing went right. He was able to make a return for the final two games, playing to his full capability. In 2006 Guy was once again struggling with injury, managing only 9 games.

2007 saw Richards vie with Carlton import Chris Bryan for the role as Josh Fraser's deputy. With the arrival of ruckman Cameron Wood via the 2007 AFL Trade period Guy was delisted by Collingwood

References

External links
Guy Richards at the Collingwood Football Club website

1983 births
Australian rules footballers from Victoria (Australia)
Collingwood Football Club players
Living people
Eastern Ranges players